Central Catholic High School (CCHS) is a private, Roman Catholic, co-educational, college-preparatory school in Modesto, California, United States. It was established in 1966 and is part of the Roman Catholic Diocese of Stockton.

Controversy 
In April 2016, two 16-year-old students were arrested for their involvement in a hate crime targeting an African American student.

Notable alumni 
 Johnny Mundt, NFL player
 Chris Pritchett, MLB player
 Byron Storer, NFL player
 DaRon Bland, NFL player

References

External links 
 

Roman Catholic Diocese of Stockton
Education in Modesto, California
High schools in Stanislaus County, California
Catholic secondary schools in California
Catholic preparatory schools in California
Educational institutions established in 1966
1966 establishments in California